Bogor Regency (Indonesian: Kabupaten Bogor) is a landlocked regency (kabupaten) of West Java, Indonesia, south of DKI Jakarta. Covering an area of 2,986.20 km2, it is considered a bedroom community for Jakarta, and was home to 5,427,068 people at the 2020 census. The official estimate as at mid 2022 was 5,566,838. Its administration is located in the town of Cibinong.

The area has witnessed significant population growth. Two areas formerly within the regency have been split off as autonomous cities; on 27 April 1999, the city of Depok was unified with some neighbouring districts of Bogor Regency to form an autonomous city of Depok (independent of the regency), while Bogor city had previously been formed as an autonomous city (similarly independent of the regency). In spite of these subtractions, Bogor Regency remains the most populous regency in Indonesia.

Origin of name 
There are various opinions about the birth of the name Bogor itself. One opinion states that the name Bogor comes from Arabic language, namely Baqar which means cow on the grounds that there is evidence in the form of a statue of a cow in the Bogor Botanical Gardens. Another opinion states that the name Bogor comes from the word Bokor which means palm tree stump. The opinion above has its own basis and reasons for being believed to be true by each expert.
 
However, based on historical records, on 7 April 1752 the word Bogor appeared in a document and it was written as "Hoofd van de Negorij Bogor", which means Head of Kampung Bogor. In the documents it is also known that the village headquarters was located within the site of the Botanical Gardens itself, which began construction in 1817.

History 
In 1745, the forerunners of the Bogor community originally came from 9 settlement groups with 3 combined major groups, namely Bogor (central region), Jonggol (eastern and northern regions) and Parung (western region) which was combined by the Governor-General Dutch Indies, Baron van Inhof into the core of the Bogor Regency community unit.

At that time, the Regent of Demang Wartawangsa tried to improve the quality of the environment and the welfare of the people based on agriculture by digging canals from Ciliwung River to Cimahpar and from Nanggewer to Kalimulya.

In 1908 Bogor Regency was composed of five kawedanan each led by a demang, namely Buitenzorg, Jonggol, Cibinong, Parung, and Leuwiliang. Then, to facilitate district tasks, a number of under-districts were formed, each headed by an assistant demang.

The history of Bogor Regency had a close relationship with the era of the kingdom that once ruled in the region. In the previous four centuries, Sri Baduga Maharaja was known as the king who started the era of Pajajaran Kingdom, The king was famous for the teachings of his venerated ancestors who pursued prosperity. Since then successively recorded in the history of the kingdoms that once ruled in the region, namely;

 Tarumanagara Kingdom, ruled by 12 kings. Ruled from 358 to 669.
 Galuh Kingdom, ruled by 14 kings. Ruled from 516 to 852.
 Kingdom of Sunda, ruled by 28 kings. Reigned from 669 to 1333.
 Kingdom of Kawali, ruled by 6 kings. Ruled from 1333 to 1482.
 Pajajaran Kingdom, ruled from 1482 to 1579. The inauguration of the famous king as Sri Baduga Maharaja, became a special concern. At that time it was known as the Kuwedabhakti Ceremony. held on June 3, 1482. That date would have been later designated as the Anniversary of the City of Bogor and the Regency of Bogor.

After the Proclamation of Independence, to be precise in the era of United States of Indonesia or RIS, Bogor Regency was included in the proposed State of Pasundan area, then defined as SK Wali Negeri Pasundan Nomor 12 which stated that in the Bogor Regency, six kawedanan would be re-established, namely;
Kawedanan Buitenzorg (covered Ciomas, Semplak, Kedunghalang, Ciawi, Cisarua, Cigombong, and Cijeruk Districts; as well as all modern Bogor City areas)
Kawedanan Cibinong (covered Cibinong, Bojonggede, Tajurhalang, Sukaraja, Citeureup, and Babakan Madang Districts)
Kawedanan Parung (covered Parung, Gunungsindur, Kemang, Rumpin and Ciseeng Districts, and Depok City)
Kawedanan Jonggol (covered Jonggol, Gunung Putri, Klapanunggal, Cileungsi, Sukamakmur, Cariu, and Tanjungsari Districts)
Kawedanan Leuwiliang (covered Leuwiliang, Cibungbulang, Ciampea, Pamijahan, and Dramaga Districts)
Kawedanan Jasinga (covered Jasinga, Sukajaya, Tenjo, Parungpanjang, Nanggung, and Cigudeg Districts).

In the 1950s, in line with the restructuring policy of regional autonomy, particularly with regard to organization and territory, Bogor Regency lost a lot of territory. The areas that lost the most territory were Kawedanan Jonggol, such as Cibarusah District and Jatisampurna District which were transferred to Bekasi Regency, while Cikalongkulon District was transferred to Cianjur Regency and Pangkalan District was transferred to Karawang Regency.

In 1975, the Central Government instructed that Bogor Regency should have a Government Center in its own Regency area. On this basis, the Regional Government of Bogor Regency conducted research in several areas of Bogor Regency to become a candidate for the capital as well as to act as the center of government. Alternative locations that were to be considered included Ciawi District, Leuwiliang District, Parung District, Semplak District and Cibinong District.

The results of further research indicated that the location submitted to the Central Government for approval as a candidate for the regency capital was Rancamaya (currently a part of Bogor City). However, the Central Government considered that Rancamaya was still relatively close to the Government Center Bogor City and it was feared that it would be swallowed up by the regional expansion and development of Bogor City.

Considering the plans at that date for the establishment of Depok as a separate administrative City and for a putative Jonggol Regency, which had been discussed by the Minister of Home Affairs Amir Machmud with the Governor of West Java, the Regional Government of Bogor Regency took one alternative area, namely Kemang which was the most midpoint for the districts in Bogor Regency if the Administrative City of Depok was formed and Jonggol Regency was separated from Bogor Regency. 

In the plenary session of the Bogor Regency DPRD in 1980, the village of Kemang was no longer to be considered as a candidate for the capital city of Bogor Regency. This was due to the limited availability of land owned by the district government and to minimal infrastructure, pending the debate on the formation of Jonggol Regency which is still considered raw. Finally, it was determined that the candidate for the capital city of Bogor Regency should be located in Tengah Village (now Kelurahan Tengah, Cibinong).

The determination of the candidate for the capital was proposed back to the Central government and received approval by Government Regulation No. 6 of 1982, which confirmed that the capital city of the Bogor Regency Government Center should be located in Tengah Village, Cibinong District. From then on, the preparation plan for the construction of the capital's Central Government began in Bogor Regency and on 5 October 1985 the groundbreaking ceremony was held by the then Regent of Bogor Regency.

Considering the vast area of ​​Bogor Regency plus the rapid population growth which is due to the geographical location of Bogor Regency as a buffer zone for Jakarta, several debates emerged regarding regional expansion based on regional development. In 1978, the Minister of Home Affairs Amir Machmud proposed the establishment of an administrative city of Depok which would include the District of Depok as well as other districts bordering Jakarta, especially those affected by the construction of Perumnas in the region. It was planned that administrative city of Depok would be made an organized residential area for workers in Jakarta.

The Governor of West Java, Aang Kunaefi, also proposed to the Minister of Home Affairs (Amir Machmud) the establishment of an area in the former Kawedanan Jonggol which has partially been to other districts to be unified as District Level II Regions. The Jonggol area and its surroundings were considered suitable, because the area is quite large, has abundant natural wealth, and has the potential as a new residential area, industry, and tourism.

The area proposed as part of the expansion was formerly part of the territory of Kawedanan Jonggol, including, among others, the areas of Jonggol, Gunung Putri, Cileungsi and Cibubur. Also considered were areas from outside Bogor Regency (such as parts of Bekasi Regency, namely Cibarusah District and Pondok Gede District (southern area)) and part of Karawang Regency (namely Pangkalan). 

In 1981, the status of Depok District was finally upgraded from district to administrative city based on Government Regulation Number 43 of 1981. Depok Administrative City was headed by the Administrative Mayor. Meanwhile, the idea of forming a separate Jonggol Regency was not implemented.

In 1994, President Suharto was interested in making one of the Bogor Regency's areas, namely Jonggol District (at that time including Sukamakmur, Cariu, and Karang Tengah). as the location for the new national capital to replace Jakarta, because Jonggol is located only 40 km southeast of Jakarta.

Post-reformation is in line with the policy of eliminating autonomous regions of Administrative Cities throughout Indonesia. The government through Law Number 15 of 1999 increased the status of Depok to that of a municipality. Thus Depok was officially separated from Bogor Regency and exercised its own autonomy. Provisional plans and preparations for moving the nation's capital to Jonggol sank along with the fall of Soeharto in 1998.

Geographics

Borders
It is bordered by Tangerang Regency, the cities of South Tangerang, Depok and Bekasi, and finally Bekasi Regency, all to the north, Sukabumi Regency to the south, Cianjur Regency to the southeast, and Karawang Regency to the east; it fully encircles Bogor City, although the latter is administratively independent of the regency. It is bordered by Lebak Regency (in Banten Province) to the west.

Demographics
In the 2010 census the regency (minus the autonomous cities) counted 4,770,744 people, of which 2,450,426 were male. The 2020 census showed this had grown to 5,427,068, and the official estimate for mid 2022 showed this had risen to 5,566,838. The Regency is the most populous in Indonesia. Given that the regency covers 2,986.20 km2 after the separation of Bogor and Depok cities, the density in 2022 stands at 1,864 people per km2.

Cibinong is its capital.

The Dutch name of the regency was "Regentschap Buitenzorg".

Ethnic groups 
Based on official data from Badan Pusat Statistik for Bogor Regency for mid 2022, the population of Bogor Regency was 5,566,838 people, with a density of 1,864 people/km2. Bogor Regency is an administrative area at the level of Regency with the largest population in West Java and even in Indonesia. The original inhabitants of Bogor Regency and West Java are generally Sundanese. Another ethnic group that is quite prominent is the Javanese, who are immigrants from the middle and east of Java Island, and some Betawi people, and also other immigrant ethnic groups including the Cirebonese, Batak, Tionghoa, Minangkabau, Bantenese.

Data 2000 Indonesian Population Census, the following is the population size of Bogor Regency based on ethnicity;

Languages 
The majority of Sundanese is spoken by residents in the southern districts bordering Bogor City and Cianjur Regency and the western districts of Bogor Regency which border Lebak Regency. Meanwhile, the Betawi Language is spoken in almost all districts bordering Bekasi City, Bekasi Regency, Depok City, South Tangerang and Tangerang Regency where this language is used.

Nature reserves (cagar alam)
Within Bogor Regency the following nature reserves exist:
 Yanlappa
 Gunung Pancar
 Telaga Warna
 Pancoran Mas

Administration 
Bogor Regency comprises 40 districts (Kecamatan), listed below with their areas and populations at the 2010 census and the 2020 census, together with the mid 2022 official estimates.

The westernmost fourteen districts proposed in 2013 to be split off to form the new West Bogor Regency  are shown in the right-hand set of columns. The twenty-six districts in the east of the Regency (which would remain part of Bogor Regency) are shown in the left-hand set of columns. However, plans are under discussion to also split off the seven easternmost districts (indicated by asterisks in the left-hand columns) to form a new East Bogor Regency with a combined population (in mid 2022) of 1,077,117; this would equate to the former proposal to create a separate Jonggol Regency which were dropped in 1998.

The above list excludes the six districts which comprise the autonomous city of Bogor, listed with their populations according to the mid-2022 official estimates:
Bogor Selatan (208,774)
Bogor Timur (106,234)
Bogor Utara (190,085)
Bogor Tengah (96,262)
Bogor Barat (238,318)
Tanah Sareal (223,840)
Total City (1,063,513)

Sports

Bogor Regency has good sports facilities. In Bogor Regency, there are also several Sports Center located in Cibinong or other districts. Besides Sports Center, Bogor Regency also has several stadiums, for example Pakansari Stadium and Persikabo Stadium are stadiums which is located in the administrative center of Bogor Regency, namely Cibinong.
 
The association football team representing Bogor Regency in Liga 1 is Persikabo 1973 which was formed after the merger of PS TIRA and Persikabo Bogor. The women's football club in Bogor Regency is Persikabo Kartini which is a women's team from Persikabo 1973. Persikabo 1973 has several support groups, for example, Kabomania and Ultras Persikabo Curva Sud.
 
Bogor Regency also has representatives in Proliga which is the highest division in the volleyball competition in Indonesia, namely Bogor LavAni which is a team founded by former president of Indonesia Susilo Bambang Yudhoyono on 1 December 2019, and made his debut in 2022 and won the title in his first season. The team is based in LavAni Sports Center, Gunung Putri.

Tourism
In Sukajadi village, Tamansari district there are three waterfalls which can be easily reached by local tourists using Angkot 03 from Bogor to Ciapus in about 45 minutes. They are Curug (Waterfall) Daun, Curug Nangka and Curug Kawung. About 8 kilometers from the gate there is another waterfall in Gunung Malang village, Gunung Malang district. The Curug Luhur falls are 50 meters high and easily accessible.

References

External links 

  Official Website 
 Nature reserve Dungus Iwul
 Nature reserve Yanlappa
 Nature reserve Telaga warna
 Nature reserve Pancoran Mas